The National Collegiate Athletic Association – South (NCAA South), established in 1999, is a regional athletic association for colleges and universities in the National Capital Region and Calabarzon regions in the Philippines. Currently, the NCAA-South has eleven member schools: First Asia Institute of Technology and Humanities, Colegio De San Juan De Letran - Calamba, De La Salle Lipa, Lyceum of the Philippines University–Batangas, Philippine Christian University– Dasmariñas, San Pablo Colleges, Emilio Aguinaldo College- Cavite, University of Perpetual Help System Laguna, San Beda College Alabang, TRACE College and University of Batangas. 

Meanwhile, its current 24th season was hosted by University of Batangas and was opened at Carmelo Q. Quizon Gymnasium on February 24, 2023.

History
The National Collegiate Athletic Association – South (NCAA South) was first established as an offshoot league of the NCAA Metro Manila in 1999 with its first four member schools, University of Perpetual Help System Laguna, Colegio De San Juan De Letran Calamba, Philippine Christian University- Dasmarinas and San Beda College Alabang. Throughout the years, NCAA South had grown with 11 member schools: First Asia Institute of Technology and Humanities, Colegio De San Juan De Letran - Calamba, De La Salle Lipa, Lyceum of the Philippines University–Batangas, Philippine Christian University– Dasmariñas, San Pablo Colleges, Emilio Aguinaldo College- Cavite, University of Perpetual Help System Laguna, San Beda College Alabang, TRACE College and University of Batangas.  

In 2010, the University of Batangas joined the NCAA South as a probationary member.

In the 15th season, the league officially welcomed its new member school, Emilio Aguinaldo College–Cavite and in the 19th season, TRACE College.

Don Bosco Technical College Mandaluyong and Saint Francis of Assisi College–Alabang dropped from the league after the 17th season.

NCAA South members

Metro Manila

Southern Luzon

Summary

See also
 NCAA Season 91
 UAAP Season 78
 NAASCU Season 15
 Fr. Bellarmine Baltasar Gymnasium

References 

Student sport in the Philippines
 
Sports in Metro Manila
Sports in Laguna (province)
Sports in Cavite
Sports in Batangas